Michaela Walsh may refer to:
 Michaela Walsh (boxer), Northern Irish boxer
 Michaela Walsh (athlete), Irish hammer thrower and shotputter
 Michaela Walsh (banker), financier, banker, founder and first president of Women's World Banking.